Goodenia pedicellata is a species of flowering plant in the family Goodeniaceae and endemic to the Pilbara region of Western Australia. It is an perennial herb with a single stem, egg-shaped to trowel-shaped leaves with the narrower end towards the base, and racemes of yellow flowers on unusually long pedicels.

Description

Taxonomy and naming
Goodenia pedicellata was first formally described in 2005 by Leigh William Sage and Kingsley Wayne Dixon in the journal Nuytsia from material collected by Dixon near a tributary of the Oakover River in 2002. The specific epithet (pedicellata) is a reference to the plant's "long and persistent pedicels".

Distribution and habitat
This goodenia grows on rocky slopes and the tops of small hills in the Pilbara biogeographic region in the north-west of Western Australia.

Conservation status
Goddenia pedicellata is classified as "Priority One" by the Government of Western Australia Department of Parks and Wildlife, meaning that it is known from only one or a few locations which are potentially at risk.

References

pedicellata
Eudicots of Western Australia
Plants described in 2005
Taxa named by Kelly Anne Shepherd